Tinnheia is a district in the city of Kristiansand in Agder county, Norway. The population is around 3,660 (2014). It is part of the borough of Grim, and it is generally populated with mostly apartment homes, with a high percentage of immigrants. West of Tinnheia is the district of Hellemyr, to the east is the district of Grim (centrum), and to the south is the district of Slettheia.

The district of Tinnheia includes an industrial area called Hannevika. Tinnheia has one elementary school, "Karl Johan Minneskole" (Karl Johan memory school). Public transport is available by Nettbuss, stops at Tinnheia are located along Line 15 which goes from Kvadraturen-Tinnheia-Kvadraturen 4 times every hour. All the streets in Tinnheia is named after metal, "Tin"-Heia. Tinnheia has the second-most apartment buildings in Kristiansand after Kvadraturen (the city centrum). Tinnheia is the smallest district in area and the 10th largest in population.

Politics
The 10 largest political parties in Tinnheia (2015):

Neighbourhoods
Hannevikåsen
Hannevika
Kolsberg
Tinnheia nordvest
Tinnheia sørøst

Transportation

Media gallery

References

Populated places in Agder
Geography of Kristiansand
Boroughs of Kristiansand